Kaba Gandhi No Delo (literally "Kaba Gandhi's house"), Rajkot was Indian leader Mahatma Gandhi's primary family home in India until 1915, including during those years when he stayed in London and in South Africa. Later on, on return from South Africa in 1915, he established Kocharab Ashram in Ahmedabad. Kaba Gandhi No Delo has now been converted into a museum called Gandhi Smriti.

Mahatma Gandhi's father, in the name of Karamchand Gandhi was also known as Kaba Gandhi. The name of the house has been derived from Gandhiji's father's name. In Gujarati, the words Kaba Gandhi No Delo literally means 'Kaba Gandhi's residence'.

History 

Kaba Gandhi No Delo, Gujarat has been built following the old and traditional styles of building houses and monuments.

Description 
Kaba Gandhi No Delo, is now a permanent exhibition. The exhibition displays and houses the Gandhi Smriti (not to be confused with Gandhi Smriti in Delhi). Kaba Gandhi No Delo, Rajkot is situated on Ghee Kanta Road at Rajkot. Rajkot was the formerly and initially the capital of the princely state of Saurastra, which is in Gujarat.

It has been converted into a memorial called "Gandhi Smriti". The museum displays and consists of photographs, objects and the belongings of the great Indian leader and Father of the Nation, Mahatma Gandhi. A Non-Government Organization runs classes in sewing and embroidery for young girls within the premises. The place is open for general public Monday through Saturday from 9 am to 12 pm and again in the afternoon from 3pm to 5pm.

Getting here 

 Road
 State transport buses are easily available from other cities of Gujarat. The bus stand is 2 km west of Bedi Gate on the other side of Ranmal Lake. Auto rickshaws are easily available to get around the city. Private buses are also available for Ahmedabad, Baroda, Mumbai, Bhuj, Bhavnagar, Una, Mount Abu and Udaipur.

 Rail
 Rajkot is well connected with important cities in Gujarat and India by rail. Trains for Delhi, Mumbai, Cochin, Coimbatore, Kolkata, Amritsar, Patna and Bhopal are available from Rajkot. The railway station known commonly as the Rajkot Junction is around 6 km away from the Teen Batti triple gateway.

 Air
 Rajkot has a functional domestic airport. Indian Airlines has four flights a week to Mumbai while Jet and Sahara have daily flights.

References 

Rajkot
Houses in India
Gandhi museums
Museums in Gujarat
Buildings and structures in Gujarat
Gujarat in Indian independence movement
Tourist attractions in Rajkot district